Dolenje Kamenje pri Dobrniču is a small settlement west of Dobrnič in the Municipality of Trebnje in southeastern Slovenia. The area is part of the historical region of Lower Carniola. The Municipality of Trebnje is now included in the Southeast Slovenia Statistical Region.

Name
The name of the settlement was changed from Dolenje Kamenje  to Dolenje Kamenje pri Dobrniču in 1953.

References

External links
Dolenje Kamenje pri Dobrniču at Geopedia

Populated places in the Municipality of Trebnje